Cuvier Island is a small uninhabited island off the east coast of the North Island of New Zealand. The  island is a wildlife sanctuary, managed by the Department of Conservation and is the subject of an ongoing island restoration project to eliminate non-native mammals and restore the original ecosystem. It is also the location of the Cuvier Island Lighthouse which was constructed in 1889 and the wreck of the old HMNZS Philomel which was scuttled near the island on 6 August 1949 after decommissioning and being stripped of useful equipment.

Geology

The island is the remains of an igneous intrusion of the Coromandel Volcanic Zone, which formed during the Miocene between 17 and 16 million years ago.

Important Bird Area
The island has been identified as an Important Bird Area by BirdLife International because of its small breeding colony of vulnerable Pycroft's petrels.

Name
The Māori name of the island is Repanga. The name Cuvier was given by D'Urville, naming it after Baron Cuvier.

See also

 New Zealand outlying islands
 List of islands of New Zealand
 List of islands
 Desert island

References

External links

Island restoration
Important Bird Areas of New Zealand
Islands of Waikato
Protected areas of Waikato
Uninhabited islands of New Zealand